Shlensky v Wrigley, 237 NE 2d 776 (Ill. App. 1968) is a leading US corporate law case, concerning the discretion of the board to determine how to balance the interests of stakeholders. It represents the shift in most states away from the idea that corporations should only pursue shareholder value, seen in the older Michigan decision of Dodge v. Ford Motor Co..

Facts
The Chicago Cubs' president, Philip K. Wrigley, refused to install field lights for night games at Wrigley Field. "Plaintiff allege[d] that Wrigley ha[d] refused to install lights, not because of interest in the welfare of the corporation but because of his personal opinions 'that baseball is a 'daytime sport' and that installation of lights and night baseball games will have a deteriorating effect upon the surrounding neighborhood'." This meant that night games could not go ahead, and so, in the view of Shlensky, would result in lower profits for shareholders. A challenge was brought by shareholder Shlensky against the directors' decision.

Importantly, the question on appeal was if Shlensky was entitled to bring a case against Wrigley at all; since this is a shareholder derivative suit, the person claiming shareholder harm (here, Shlensky) normally has to prove that the directors of a corporation committed fraud, illegal acts, or had a conflict of interest. This affected the Court's analysis of the facts, as they were deciding on the type of legal claim and not explicitly deciding whether Wrigley's actions were good or bad.

Judgment
The Court affirmed the director's decision. The president was not liable for failing to maximize returns to shareholders. It was,

See also

United States corporate law

Notes

References
Choper, Coffee and Gilson, Cases and Materials on Corporations (2010)

United States corporate case law
Illinois state case law
Wrigley Field
1968 in United States case law
1968 in Illinois